Ben Johnson (born 24 August 1946) is a British painter, known for his series of large, detailed cityscapes.

Life and work

Ben Johnson was born in Llandudno, Wales, in 1946. He studied at the Royal College of Art and has lived and worked in London since 1965.

His first solo exhibition was at the Wickesham Gallery, New York, in 1969 immediately after graduating from the Royal College. He is known for his paintings based on architectural spaces and his large-scale, intricately detailed cityscape paintings, which include panoramas of Hong Kong, Zürich, Jerusalem, Liverpool and, most recently, his view of London which was completed as part of a residency at the National Gallery, London, in 2010.

Over the past 46 years he has exhibited in galleries and museums across the world, including the Institute of Contemporary Arts, London; the Walker Art Gallery, Liverpool; the Art Institute of Chicago; Kunsthalle Tübingen; and the Museo Thyssen-Bornemisza, Madrid. At the first Venice Architecture Biennale in 1991, Norman Foster portrayed his work solely through Johnson's images, before Johnson's work was included in Foster's installation at the 2012 biennale. His work is part of a travelling exhibition currently touring museum venues in Europe, and the first retrospective exhibition of his paintings was scheduled to open in September 2015 at the Southampton City Museum and Art Gallery.

He has undertaken commissions for the Royal Institute of British Architects, the British Museum and National Museums Liverpool as well as for IBM, HSBC, JP Morgan, British Steel, Hong Kong Telecommunications among others.

In 2000, the collector and philanthropist Nasser D. Khalili commissioned a set of five paintings titled "House of Peace", depicting spiritual sites of Jerusalem, intended to promote harmony between Abrahamic religions.

His work is included in the permanent collections of museums worldwide, including the Victoria & Albert Museum, London; the Centre Georges Pompidou, Paris; the Museum of Modern Art, New York; the Regional Services Museum, Hong Kong; and the Government Art Collection.

As of 2014, Johnson has been exploring the ageing and scarring of architecture and, in tandem, investigating geometry and the sacred embodied in Islamic architecture.  A second solo exhibition at Alan Cristea Gallery opened in May 2014.

In October 2015, Johnson collected an honorary fellowship from Wrexham’s Glyndŵr University.

The Liverpool Cityscape

The Liverpool Cityscape comprises 170 hectares of the city, a near bird’s-eye perspective. It encompasses several thousand individual buildings and took Johnson and up to 11 assistants 24,000 person hours to complete it. In making The Liverpool Cityscape, Johnson explored the city, (taking over 3000 reference photographs) considered alternative viewpoints, consulted with architects and historians, as well as the people of Liverpool, and absorbed the city’s distinctive atmosphere. Thousands of detailed drawings were produced before the execution of the painting in minute detail.

During February and March 2008 over 51,000 people came to see Ben work on the painting at the Walker Art Gallery in a specially created studio. A live web-cam showing his residency in the Walker was set up to enable the World to watch the creation of the painting online. The resulting exhibition had over 250,000 visits.

The Liverpool Cityscape is permanently on display in the Skylight Gallery of the new Museum of Liverpool.

Personal life

Whilst at the Royal College of Art, Johnson met Sheila Kellehar, whom he later married. The couple has two sons Jamie Jay Johnson and Charlie Johnson.

Paintings

Works in Public Collections
 Walker Art Gallery, Liverpool 
 Boymans-van Beuningen Museum, Rotterdam 
 The British Council, London
 The Contemporary Arts Society, London
 De Beers/CSO Collection, London
 Royal Institute of British Architects, London
 Glasgow Museums, Glasgow
 Whitworth Art Gallery, Manchester
 Centre Georges Pompidou, Paris
 Victoria & Albert Museum, London
 Deutsche Bank 
 British Petroleum
 Guildhall Art Gallery, Corporation of London
 Special Administrative Regional Government of Hong Kong, New Convention & Exhibition Centre, Hong Kong
 Regional Services Council Museum, Hong Kong
 Museum of London
 The British Museum
 The Government Art Collection

Solo exhibitions

2015     "Spirit of Place: Paintings from 1969 to the present", Southampton City Art Gallery, Southampton 
2014     "Time Past, Time Present", Alan Cristea Gallery, London, 2014 
2010–11  "Modern Perspectives", National Gallery, London 
2010 	 “Ben Johnson Paintings,” Alan Cristea Gallery, London 
2008 	 "Ben Johnson's Liverpool Cityscape 2008 and the World Panorama Series," Walker Art Gallery, Liverpool 
2008 	 Artist in Residence, Walker Art Gallery, Liverpool
2002 	"Still Time," Blains Fine Art, London
2001 	"Jerusalem, The Eternal City," Chester Beatty Museum, Dublin

Selected group exhibitions

2012–14  Travelling exhibition: “Photorealism” Kunsthalle Tübingen, Germany; Museo Thyssen-Bornemisza, Spain; Kunstmuseum Thun, Switzerland; Birmingham Museum & Art Gallery, UK; Gemeentemuseum Den Haag, Netherlands; World Cultural Heritage Völklinger Hütte, Germany
2012 	“Beyond Reality, British Painting Today” Galerie Rudolfinum, Prague 
2012 	Contributed to Norman Foster installation, Venice Biennale, Venice

Notes and references

External links

, Studio International Interview, 'Time Past, Time Present' at Alan Cristea Gallery, 2014
Ben Johnson, Artist's website
Alan Cristea Gallery, available works from Alan Cristea Gallery
Bohun Gallery, available works from Bohun Gallery, Henley on Thames
"Still small voice of calm", article by Jonathan Glancey. The Guardian, Saturday 9 March 2002
Articles and Reviews

20th-century Welsh painters
20th-century British male artists
21st-century Welsh painters
21st-century Welsh male artists
21st-century male artists
People from Llandudno
1946 births
Living people
Welsh male painters
20th-century Welsh male artists